Blake Weeks Brockermeyer (born April 11, 1973) is a former American football offensive tackle who played for the Carolina Panthers, Chicago Bears, and Denver Broncos in the NFL. He is currently serving as offensive line coach for the Sea Lions of The Spring League.

Early life and education
Brockermeyer attended high school at Arlington Heights High School in Fort Worth, Texas. He played college football at the University of Texas, starting all 34 games while attending. He was a two-time All-SWC offensive tackle in 1993 and 1994, as well as an All-American in 1994.

Honors
Brockermeyer was inducted into the Sun Bowl Hall of Fame and is in the University of Texas Hall of Honor.

Family
Brockermeyer married his wife, Kristy, in 1996. The couple has four sons: Jack, Luke, Tommy and James. His oldest son, Jack, graduated from Rice University in May 2020. Luke plays linebacker for the University of Texas. Twins Tommy and James both play offensive line for the University of Alabama.

References

1973 births
American football offensive tackles
Carolina Panthers players
Chicago Bears players
Denver Broncos players
Living people
People from Fort Worth, Texas
Sportspeople from Fort Worth, Texas
Texas Longhorns football players